The Aille River is a river in County Mayo, Ireland, flowing from the Partry Mountains to Lough Mask, and flows underground for part of its course.

Course
The Aille River rises in the Partry Mountains 16 km (10 mi) south of Westport, drains the northwest part of the Partry range and sinks underground at the Aille Caves. It continues as a subterranean river for 4 km (2.5 mi), resurging at Pollatoomary. It flows south to Cloon Lough, which feeds into Lough Mask.

See also
Rivers of Ireland

References

Rivers of County Mayo